George Albert McGuire (April 7, 1871 – July 2, 1955) was a dentist and political figure in British Columbia. He represented Vancouver City from 1907 to 1916 in the Legislative Assembly of British Columbia as a Conservative.

He was born in Mount Forest, Ontario and received a D.D.S. from the University of Maryland in 1892. He moved to Vancouver later that year, where he practised as a dentist until his retirement in 1951. McGuire served in the provincial cabinet as Provincial Secretary and Minister of Education. He was president of the British Columbia Dental Association in 1906. McGuire died in Coquitlam at the age of 84.

References 

1871 births
1955 deaths
British Columbia Conservative Party MLAs
People from Wellington County, Ontario
University System of Maryland alumni